Simon bar Giora (alternatively known as Simeon bar Giora or Simon ben Giora or Shimon bar Giora,  or ; died 71 CE) was the leader of one of the major Judean rebel factions during the First Jewish–Roman War in 1st-century Roman Judea, who vied for control of the Jewish polity while attempting to expel the Roman army, but incited a bitter internecine war in the process.

Life
Simon bar Giora, a Gerasene by birth (thought to be from Gerasa [Jurish] in Samaria, although there were several towns by that name), became notable during the First Jewish–Roman War, when Roman troops under Cestius Gallus marched towards Jerusalem in 66. Simon spearheaded the attack against these advancing Roman troops, and helped in defeating the advance by attacking from the north, as they approached Beth Horon. He put the hindmost of the army into disorder and carried off many of the beasts that carried the weapons of war, and led them into the city. This victory marked the beginning of the First Jewish-Roman War, in the 12th-year of Nero's reign. However, he was rejected for a command position by the Jerusalem authorities, for they did not want a popular leader of a rebellious peasantry if they were to moderate the revolt and negotiate with the Romans. As a result, Simon gathered a large number of revolutionaries and started robbing houses of wealthy people in the district of Acrabbene:

Meanwhile, a large force of Idumeans had encamped outside the walls of Jerusalem, and were barred by the citizenry from entering inside the city, in hopes of preserving the peace. Members of the Zealot party secretly opened one of the gates to bring them inside, hoping thereby to augment their forces against the common enemy of Rome. Now outraged that they had been barred from the city by the citizenry, the Idumeans went about murdering the common people of the city, including two of Israel's High Priests, Ananus ben Ananus and Joshua ben Gamla.

Simon stayed safe in Masada from the Judean provisional Government authorities until Ananus ben Ananus was killed in the Zealot Temple Siege, after which he left the fortress for the hill country and proclaimed liberty for those in slavery, and a reward to those already free. He gathered power quickly as more people and influential men joined him. He soon dared to venture into the flatlands, constructed a fort in a village called Nain, and stored food and booty within caves in Pharan valley. It was obvious that he prepared to attack Jerusalem. However, Simon ben Giora first attacked Idumea to the south of Jerusalem, sacking its many villages, and his intimidating army met no real resistance. He marched into Hebron, robbed the grain stores of towns and villages, and plundered the countryside in order to feed his vast troops. By this time, he was followed by forty thousand people not including his soldiers. Simon's success began worrying the Zealot factions in Jerusalem. Since they did not dare fight in open battle, they lay an ambush, capturing his wife and some of her entourage. They expected Simon to lay down his weapons in exchange for her freedom. However, Simon grew very angry, went to Jerusalem and took everybody leaving the city captive. Some he tortured, some he killed and he cut off the hands of others, sending them back into the city with the message that he would do likewise to all Jerusalem if his wife was not released. This frightened the Zealots so immensely that they eventually let her go.

In the spring 69 CE, the advancing Roman army forced Simon ben Giora to retreat to Jerusalem. Within Jerusalem, John of Giscala had set himself up as a despotic ruler after overthrowing lawful authority of the Judean provisional government in the Zealot Temple Siege. In order to get rid of him, the remaining Jerusalem authorities decided to invite Simon to enter the city and to drive John away. Acclaimed by the people as their savior and guardian, Simon was admitted. Simon, with fifteen thousand soldiers at hand, soon controlled the whole upper city and some of the lower city, setting up his place of residence in the tower of Phasael. John held parts of the lower city and the Temple's outer court with six thousand men and a third splinter group of twenty-four hundred men controlled the temple's inner court.

Within the city, factions fought vigorously over the control of Jerusalem, always trying to destroy each other's grain stores to starve each other into submission. This internal fighting later proved disastrous: not only was this a sabbatical year (with less grain available), but the city was under siege by the time the harvest began. Of the leaders of the rebellion, Simon in particular was regarded as a ruthless leader, who eventually ordered the execution of the High Priest Matthias ben Boethus and three of his sons, thinking that they were on the side of the Romans. The historian Josephus wrote that "Simon was a greater terror to the people than the Romans themselves." By his authority, coins were minted declaring the redemption of Zion.

Just before Passover in 70, Titus began the siege of Jerusalem. He quickly took down the first and second wall, but then met fierce resistance as the rebel Judean factions within Jerusalem realized the necessity of joining forces. However, Simon and John both upheld their reigns of terror over the citizens, causing many to flee to the Romans. To counteract these desertions, Simon put every potential betrayer, including some of his previous friends, to death. In August 70, five months after the siege began, Jerusalem fell to Titus. Simon escaped into the subterranean passages of the Temple Mount. By means of stone cutters he tried to dig a way to freedom, but ran out of food before he could finish. Clothed in the garments of a Judean king he rose out of the ground at the very spot where the Temple had stood, was taken prisoner and brought to Rome, where he was imprisoned in Mamertine Prison.

Like kings of other countries Simon was paraded through the streets of Rome in chains during the triumphal procession. Judged a rebel and a traitor by the Romans, he was executed by being thrown to his death from the Tarpeian Rock near the Temple of Jupiter.

See also 
 Bar-Giora (organization)

References

Bibliography

 

 
 

Jews and Judaism in the Roman Empire
1st-century Jews
71 deaths
Year of birth unknown
1st-century executions
People executed by the Roman Empire
People of the First Jewish–Roman War
Siege of Jerusalem (70 CE)